Lisa-Marie Vizaniari (born 14 December 1971 in Lake Cargelligo, New South Wales) is an Australian retired discus thrower and a retired professional boxer. She is openly lesbian.

Her personal best throw was 65.86 metres, achieved in March 1997 in Melbourne. The Australian, and Oceanian, record then belonged to Daniela Costian with 68.72 metres.

Achievements

1Representing Oceania

Professional boxing

In 2001, Vizaniari made her professional debut as a boxer. Vizaniari is a two time World Heavyweight Champion.

Professional titles
South Pacific Women's Heavyweight Title (218 Ibs)
World Boxing Foundation female heavyweight title (272¼ Ibs)
Women's International Boxing Association World heavyweight title (269¾ Ibs)

Professional record

References

External links
 

 athlitikotetradio.blogspot.com

1971 births
Living people
Australian women boxers
Australian female discus throwers
Australian people of Greek descent
Athletes (track and field) at the 1990 Commonwealth Games
Athletes (track and field) at the 1994 Commonwealth Games
Athletes (track and field) at the 1998 Commonwealth Games
Athletes (track and field) at the 1996 Summer Olympics
Athletes (track and field) at the 2000 Summer Olympics
Commonwealth Games medallists in athletics
Olympic athletes of Australia
People from New South Wales
Australian Institute of Sport track and field athletes
Commonwealth Games gold medallists for Australia
Commonwealth Games silver medallists for Australia
Commonwealth Games bronze medallists for Australia
World boxing champions
Competitors at the 1998 Goodwill Games
Australian LGBT sportspeople
LGBT boxers
LGBT track and field athletes
Lesbian sportswomen
Australian female shot putters
Medallists at the 1990 Commonwealth Games
Medallists at the 1994 Commonwealth Games